"Falling Over You" was the second single, released in September 1989, by Australian rock group The Triffids from their album The Black Swan (April 1989). It was produced by Stephen Street (The Smiths, Morrissey) and co-written by David McComb and Adam Peters. The tracks were recorded between September and October 1988 at The Justice Room, Cathanger, Somerset and mixed at Fallout Shelter, London, November 1988.  "You Minus Me" was written and produced by McComb. The single appeared as a 7", 12" and cassette single version.

Track listing
"Falling Over You"
"Can't Help Falling in Love"
"You Minus Me" (12")

Personnel

The Triffids
 David McComb – vocals
 Robert McComb
 Graham Lee – classic guitar
 Alsy MacDonald
 Martyn Casey
 Jill Birt

Additional musicians
 Adam Peters – programming
 Philip Kakulas
 Rita Menendez

References

External links
 Discogs track listings - "Falling Over You"
 A Retrospective with Graham Lee and Rob McComb by Wilson Neate

1989 singles
The Triffids songs
Song recordings produced by Stephen Street
1989 songs
Island Records singles
Songs written by David McComb